The Inland Empire 66ers of San Bernardino are a Minor League Baseball team of the California League and the Single-A affiliate of the Los Angeles Angels. The 66ers are based in San Bernardino, California, and play at San Manuel Stadium.

Franchise history
The 66ers began when the Salinas Spurs moved to San Bernardino and bought the name of the San Bernardino Spirit from the Rancho Cucamonga Quakes who had just left town. The team was bought by Elmore Sports Group soon afterwards. The team originally played at Fiscalini Field until 1996 when the team moved to San Bernardino Stadium, nicknamed "The Ranch" in concert with the team's new name, the San Bernardino Stampede.

Later, the stadium was re-christened San Manuel Stadium sponsored by the San Manuel Band of Mission Indians with their casino.

The team name was later changed to the team's current name, the Inland Empire 66ers, taken from the historic U. S. Route 66 that ran through San Bernardino.

In September 2006, the 66ers announced they were renewing its affiliation with the Los Angeles Dodgers beginning in the 2007 season. That affiliation would last through the end of the 2010 season.

In September 2010, the 66ers agreed to a two-year affiliation with the Los Angeles Angels to be the MLB club's minor league "High A" ball affiliate.

The team was once unique for having a National Public Radio affiliate, KVCR-FM, as the station that broadcast its games on radio. However, in 2008 the team changed its station to commercial talk station KCAA.

In conjunction with Major League Baseball's restructuring of Minor League Baseball in 2021, the 66ers were organized into the Low-A West. They retained their affiliation with the Angels. In 2022, the Low-A West became known as the California League, the name historically used by the regional circuit prior to the 2021 reorganization, and was reclassified as a Single-A circuit.

Season-by-season records
San Bernardino Spirit (1993–1995)
San Bernardino Stampede (1996–2002)
Inland Empire 66ers (2003–present)

Roster

Notable alumni

Hall of Fame alumni

Ken Griffey Jr. (1988) Inducted, 2016

Notable alumni
Adrián Beltré (1996) 4 x MLB All-Star
Zach Borenstein (MVP)

 Dave Burba (1988)

 Asdrúbal Cabrera (2005) 2 x MLB All-Star

 Tom Candiotti (1996)

 Shin-Soo Choo (2002–2003)

 Jeff Cirillo (2003) 2 x MLB All-Star

 Del Crandall (1996–1997, MGR) 11 x MLB All-Star

Rich Dauer (1988, MGR) MLB All-Star

 Ivan DeJesus (1992, MGR)

 Rafael Furcal (2007, 2010) 3 x MLB All-Star; 2000 NL Rookie of the Year

 Mark Grudzielanek (1999) MLB All-Star
Kenley Jansen (2009–2010) 2 x MLB All-Star
Mike Hampton (1992) 2 x MLB All-Star
Mark Harmon

 Matt Herges (1995) 
Félix Hernández

 Orel Hershiser (2000) 1988 World Series Most Valuable Player; 1988 NL Cy Young Award

 Todd Hollandsworth (1995, 1997, 1999) 1996 NL Rookie of the Year

 Eric Karros (1998) N1992 L Rookie of the Year
Paul Konerko (1995) 6 x MLB All-Star

 Ted Lilly (1997) 2 x MLB All-Star

 Brandon Morrow (2006)

 Gregg Olson MLB All Star; 1989 NL Rookie of the Year

 Scott Radinsky (1995)

Rene Rivera

 David Ross (2000)

Carlos Santana (2008)

 Bill Swift (1989) 1992 NL ERA Leader

 Luis Valbuena (2006)

 Ismael Valdez (1998)

 Omar Vizquel (1990) 11 x Gold Glove; 3 x MLB All-Star

 Tim Wallach (1995)(1998, MGR) 5 x MLB All-Star

 Devon White (2000) 7 x Gold Glove; 3 x MLB All-Star

 Terry Whitfield (1987)

 C.J. Wilson (1986) 2 x MLB All-Star
Steve Yeager, coach

References

External links
Official website

Professional baseball teams in California
 01
Sports in San Bernardino, California
Sports in the Inland Empire
California League teams
Baseball teams established in 1987
Los Angeles Angels minor league affiliates
Los Angeles Angels of Anaheim minor league affiliates
Los Angeles Dodgers minor league affiliates
San Francisco Giants minor league affiliates
Seattle Mariners minor league affiliates
1987 establishments in California